Dinocras is a genus of stoneflies belonging to the family Perlidae, one of the oldest order of insects (about 220 million of years ago).

Species
 Dinocras cephalotes (Curtis, 1827)
 Dinocras ferreri (Pictet, 1841)
 Dinocras megacephala (Klapálek, 1907)

External links
 Fauna Europaea 
 Biolib

Perlidae
Insects described in 1907
Plecoptera genera